Marko Sedlaček (born 29 July 1996) is a Croatian professional volleyball player. He is a member of the Croatia national team. At the professional club level, he plays for Top Volley Cisterna.

Career
On 12 May 2021, Sedlaček signed a contract with Galatasaray İstanbul.

Honours
 National championships
 2013/2014  Croatian Cup, with Mladost Zagreb
 2016/2017  Croatian SuperCup, with Mladost Zagreb
 2016/2017  Croatian Cup, with Mladost Zagreb
 2017/2018  Croatian SuperCup, with Mladost Zagreb
 2017/2018  Croatian Championship, with Mladost Zagreb
 2018/2019  Croatian Cup, with Mladost Zagreb
 2018/2019  Croatian Championship, with Mladost Zagreb

References

External links

 
 Player profile at LegaVolley.it  
 Player profile at Volleybox.net

1996 births
Living people
Sportspeople from Zagreb
Croatian men's volleyball players
Mediterranean Games medalists in volleyball
Mediterranean Games gold medalists for Croatia
Competitors at the 2022 Mediterranean Games
Croatian expatriate sportspeople in France
Expatriate volleyball players in France
Croatian expatriate sportspeople in Italy
Expatriate volleyball players in Italy
Croatian expatriate sportspeople in Turkey
Expatriate volleyball players in Turkey
Galatasaray S.K. (men's volleyball) players
Outside hitters
21st-century Croatian people